The 1974 Asian Taekwondo Championships were the 1st edition of the Asian Taekwondo Championships, and were held in Seoul, South Korea from 18 to 20 October, 1974.

Medal summary

Medal table

References

 Results

External links
WT Official Website

Asian Championships
Asian Taekwondo Championships
Asian Taekwondo Championships
International taekwondo competitions hosted by South Korea